John Prynne Parkes Pixell (1725 – 1784) was an English poet, priest and composer.

Background
Pixell was educated at the Birmingham Free School and at Queen's College, Oxford. He became the vicar of Edgbaston in 1751,

Published works
One of his poems, "Transcrib'd from the Rev. Mr Pixell's Parsonage Garden" was published in Robert Dodsley's 1758 anthology A Collection of Poems in Six Volumes: by Several Hands.

Pixell published two collections of songs, A Collection of Songs with their Recitatives and Symphonies for the German Flute, Violins, etc., with a Thorough Bass for the Harpsichord, which was published in Birmingham in 1759 and with a title page and subscription list printed by John Baskerville, and Odes, Cantatas, Songs, etc., divine, moral, entertaining, op.2 , published in Birmingham in 1775.

References

External links
 John Prynne Parkes Pixell at the Eighteenth-Century Poetry Archive (ECPA)

English composers
People from Birmingham, West Midlands
1725 births
1784 deaths
18th-century composers
18th-century male musicians
English male poets